Putnam County is a county located in the central portion of the U.S. state of Georgia. As of the 2020 census, the population was 22,047. The county seat is Eatonton.

Since the early 21st century, the county has had a housing boom. It has proximity to Lake Oconee, Lake Sinclair, and the Oconee River, all of which are recreation sites, as well as to major employment centers such as Atlanta, Athens, and Macon.

History
Putnam County is named in honor of Israel Putnam, a hero of the French and Indian War and a general in the American Revolutionary War. It was settled by European Americans after the war, as migrants moved down from the Upper South. The county was created on December 10, 1807, by an act of the Georgia General Assembly.

Following the invention of the cotton gin, which could profitably process short-staple cotton, the county was developed for cotton cultivation of that type. It thrived in the upland areas, where plantations were developed and worked by the field labor of thousands of African-American slaves.

During the 1919 Red Summer there were many incidents of racial violence including an arson attack where almost a dozen black community buildings were burnt down in late May 1919. The Wheeling Intelligencer claimed the buildings were burnt down because of a "minor racial clash at Dennis Station." During this time armed black and white mobs patrolled the area in fear of each other. 

In the first half of the 20th century, thousands of blacks left the state during the Great Migration from 1920 to 1960. The county population dropped by more than half during this period following mechanization of agriculture and as rural workers moved into cities. Since the late 20th century, population has increased. The white population of the county has grown since the turn of the 21st century: in 2010 African Americans comprised 26 percent of the county population, a drop from nearly 42% in 2000.

In the 21st century, dairy farming is more important to Putnam County than cotton. It annually holds the nationally known Dairy Festival.

Geography
The entirety of Putnam County is located in the Upper Oconee River sub-basin of the Altamaha River basin.
The county is located in the Piedmont region of the state, with rolling hills, farms, and lakes covering a majority of the county.

Major highways

  U.S. Route 129
  U.S. Route 129 Business
  U.S. Route 441
  U.S. Route 441 Business
  State Route 16
  State Route 24
  State Route 24 Business
  State Route 44
  State Route 142
  State Route 212

Adjacent counties
 Morgan County (north)
 Greene County (northeast)
 Hancock County (east)
 Baldwin County (southeast)
 Jones County (southwest)
 Jasper County (west)

National protected area
 Oconee National Forest (part)

Demographics

2000 census
As of the census of 2000, there were 18,812 people, 7,402 households, and 5,477 families living in the county. There were 10,319 housing units at an average density of 30 per square mile (12/km2). The racial makeup of the county was 51.45% White, 41.90% Black or African American, 0.20% Native American, 0.66% Asian, 0.04% Pacific Islander, 0.82% from other races, and 0.92% from two or more races.  2.16% of the population were Hispanic or Latino of any race.

There were 7,402 households, out of which 28.50% had children under the age of 18 living with them, 56.80% were married couples living together, 12.80% had a female householder with no husband present, and 26.00% were non-families. 22.00% of all households were made up of individuals, and 7.80% had someone living alone who was 65 years of age or older.  The average household size was 2.50 and the average family size was 2.90.

In the county, the population was spread out, with 23.20% under the age of 18, 7.70% from 18 to 24, 27.00% from 25 to 44, 28.00% from 45 to 64, and 14.10% who were 65 years of age or older.  The median age was 40 years. For every 100 females, there were 97.00 males.  For every 100 females age 18 and over, there were 96.40 males.

The median income for a household in the county was $36,956, and the median income for a family was $43,262. Males had a median income of $30,900 versus $21,823 for females. The per capita income for the county was $20,161.  About 10.50% of families and 14.60% of the population were below the poverty line, including 20.80% of those under age 18 and 9.80% of those age 65 or over.

2010 census
As of the 2010 United States Census, there were 21,218 people, 8,601 households, and 6,075 families living in the county. The racial makeup of the county was 67.9% white, 26.0% black or African American, 0.5% Asian, 0.2% American Indian, 0.1% Pacific islander, 4.1% from other races, and 1.2% from two or more races. Those of Hispanic or Latino origin made up 6.3% of the population. In terms of ancestry, 27.2% were American, 26.0% African American, 10.7% were Irish, 9.9% were English, and 5.9% were German.

Of the 8,601 households, 29.0% had children under the age of 18 living with them, 51.8% were married couples living together, 14.2% had a female householder with no husband present, 29.4% were non-families, and 24.7% of all households were made up of individuals. The average household size was 2.45 and the average family size was 2.88. The median age was 43.5 years.

The median income for a household in the county was $41,529 and the median income for a family was $49,814. Males had a median income of $31,915 versus $30,857 for females. The per capita income for the county was $25,576. About 9.3% of families and 12.3% of the population were below the poverty line, including 17.0% of those under age 18 and 12.0% of those age 65 or over.

2020 census

As of the 2020 United States census, there were 22,047 people, 8,937 households, and 6,282 families residing in the county.

Communities
 Crooked Creek
 Eatonton
 Willard

Education
The Putnam County Charter School System serves the community.

Politics

See also

 National Register of Historic Places listings in Putnam County, Georgia
 Tama-Re
 Rock Eagle Effigy Mound
 Rock Hawk Effigy Mound
 2017 Georgia prison escape
List of counties in Georgia

Bibliography
Notes

References
  - Total pages: 368

External links
 LostWorlds.org | Rock Eagle

 
1807 establishments in Georgia (U.S. state)
Georgia (U.S. state) counties
Populated places established in 1807